Sir Henry Bessemer  (19 January 1813 – 15 March 1898) was an English inventor, whose steel-making process would become the most important technique for making steel in the nineteenth century for almost one hundred years from 1856 to 1950. He also played a significant role in establishing the town of Sheffield, nicknamed ‘Steel City’, as a major industrial centre.

Bessemer had been trying to reduce the cost of steel-making for military ordnance, and developed his system for blowing air through molten pig iron to remove the impurities. This made steel easier, quicker and cheaper to manufacture, and revolutionised structural engineering. One of the most significant inventors of the Second Industrial Revolution, Bessemer also made over 100 other inventions in the fields of iron, steel and glass. Unlike many inventors, he managed to bring his own projects to fruition and profited financially from their success. He was knighted for his contribution to science in 1879, and in the same year was made a fellow of the Royal Society.

Father: Anthony Bessemer
Bessemer's father, Anthony, was born in London into a Huguenot family, but moved to Paris when he was about 21 years old. He was an inventor who, while engaged by the Paris Mint, made a machine for making medallions that could produce steel dies from a larger model. He became a member of the French Academy of Science, for his improvements to the optical microscope when he was 26. He was forced to leave Paris by the French Revolution, and returned to Britain. There he invented a process for making gold chains, which was successful, and enabled him to buy a small estate in the village of Charlton, near Hitchin in Hertfordshire, where Henry was born. According to Bessemer he was given his name by his godfather Henry Caslon, who employed his father as a punchcutter.

Early inventions
The invention from which Bessemer made his first fortune was a series of six steam-powered machines for making bronze powder, used in the manufacture of gold paint. As he relates in his autobiography, he examined the bronze powder made in Nuremberg which was the only place where it was made at the time. He then copied and improved the product and made it capable of being made on a simple production line. It was an early example of reverse engineering where a product is analysed, and then reproduced.

The process was kept secret, with only members of his immediate family having access to the factory. The Nuremberg powder, which was made by hand, retailed in London for £5 12s per pound and he eventually reduced the price to half a crown , or about 1/40th.
The profits from sale of the paint allowed him to pursue his other inventions.

Bessemer patented a method for making a continuous ribbon of plate glass in 1848, but it was not commercially successful (see his autobiography, chapter 8). He gained experience in designing furnaces, which was to be of great use for his new steel-making process.

Bessemer process

Henry Bessemer worked on the problem of manufacturing cheap steel for ordnance production from 1850 to 1855 when he patented his method.

On 24 August 1856 Bessemer first described the process to a meeting of the British Association in Cheltenham which he titled "The Manufacture of Malleable Iron and Steel without Fuel." It was published in full in The Times. The Bessemer process involved using oxygen in air blown through molten pig iron to burn off the impurities and thus create steel. James Nasmyth had been working on a similar idea for some time prior to this. A reluctant patentor, and in this instance still working through some problems in his method, Nasmyth abandoned the project after hearing Bessemer at the meeting. Bessemer acknowledged the efforts of Nasmyth by offering him a one-third share of the value of his patent. Nasmyth turned it down as he was about to retire.

Many industries were constrained by the lack of steel, being reliant on cast iron and wrought iron alone. Examples include railway structures such as bridges and tracks, where the treacherous nature of cast iron was keenly felt by many engineers and designers. There had been many accidents when cast iron beams collapsed suddenly, such as the Dee Bridge disaster of May 1847, the Wootton bridge collapse and the Bull bridge accident of 1860. The problem recurred at the Tay Bridge disaster of 1879, and failures continued until all cast iron under-bridges were replaced by steel structures. Wrought iron structures were much more reliable with very few failures.

Though this process is no longer commercially used, at the time of its invention it was of enormous industrial importance because it lowered the cost of production steel, leading to steel being widely substituted for cast iron and wrought iron. Bessemer's attention was drawn to the problem of steel manufacture in the course of an attempt to improve the construction of guns.

Implementation
Bessemer licensed the patent for his process to five ironmasters, but from the outset, the companies had great difficulty producing good-quality steel. Mr Göran Fredrik Göransson, a Swedish ironmaster, using the purer charcoal pig iron of that country, was the first to make good steel by the process, but only after many attempts. His results prompted Bessemer to try a purer iron obtained from Cumberland hematite, but even with this he had only limited success because the quantity of carbon was difficult to control. Robert Forester Mushet had carried out thousands of experiments at Darkhill Ironworks, in the Forest of Dean, and had shown that the quantity of carbon could be controlled by removing almost all of it from the iron and then adding an exact amount of carbon and manganese, in the form of spiegeleisen. This improved the quality of the finished product and increased its malleability.

When Bessemer tried to induce makers to take up his improved system, he met with general rebuffs and was eventually driven to undertake the exploitation of the process himself. He erected steelworks in Sheffield in a business partnership with others, such as W & J Galloway & Sons, and began to manufacture steel. At first the output was insignificant, but gradually the magnitude of the operations was enlarged until the competition became effective, and steel traders generally became aware that the firm of Henry Bessemer & Co. was underselling them to the extent of UK£10–£15 a ton. This argument to the pocket quickly had its effect, and licences were applied for in such numbers that, in royalties for the use of his process, Bessemer received a sum in all considerably exceeding a million pounds sterling.

However Mushet received nothing and by 1866 was destitute and in ill health. In that year his 16-year-old daughter, Mary, travelled to London alone, to confront Bessemer at his offices, arguing that his success was based on the results of her father's work. Bessemer decided to pay Mushet an annual pension of £300, a very considerable sum, which he paid for over 20 years, possibly with a view to keeping the Mushets from legal action. Bessemer also had works in Greenwich, London, adjacent to the River Thames, from about 1865.

W. M. Lord has said with regard to this success that "Sir Henry Bessemer was somewhat exceptional. He had developed his process from an idea to a practical reality in his own lifetime and he was sufficiently of a businessman to have profited by it. In so many cases, inventions were not developed quickly and the plums went to other persons than the inventors."

Other inventions

Bessemer was a prolific inventor and held at least 129 patents, spanning from 1838 to 1883. These included military ordnance, movable dies for embossed postage stamps, a screw extruder to extract sugar from sugar cane, and others in the fields of iron, steel and glass. These are described in some detail in his autobiography.

After suffering from seasickness in 1868, he designed the SS Bessemer (also called the "Bessemer Saloon"), a passenger steamship with a cabin on gimbals designed to stay level, however rough the sea, to save her passengers from seasickness. The mechanism – hydraulics controlled by a steersman watching a spirit level – worked in model form and in a trial version built in his garden in Denmark Hill, London. However, it never received a proper seagoing test as, when the ship demolished part of the Calais pier on her maiden voyage, investor confidence was lost and the ship was scrapped.

Continuous casting 
Bessemer also obtained a patent in 1857 for the casting of metal between contrarotating rollers – a forerunner of today's continuous casting processes and remarkably, Bessemer's original idea has been implemented in the direct continuous casting of steel strip.

Death

Bessemer died in March 1898 at Denmark Hill, London. He is buried in West Norwood cemetery,
London SE27. Other influential Victorians such as Sir Henry Tate, Sir Henry Doulton and Baron de Reuters are buried in the same cemetery.

Honours and legacy
Bessemer was knighted by Queen Victoria for his contribution to science on 26 June 1879, and in the same year was made a fellow of the Royal Society. An honorary membership was conferred on Bessemer by the Institution of Engineers and Shipbuilders in Scotland in 1891. In 1895, he was elected a Foreign Honorary Member of the American Academy of Arts and Sciences. Sheffield's Kelham Island Industrial Heritage Museum maintains an early example of a Bessemer converter for public viewing.

A school was named after him in the town of Hitchin, and when the school was demolished in the 1980s the new road built in its place was named Bessemer Close in 1995. Bessemer Way in Rotherham is also named in his honour. In 2009, the public house "The Fountain" in Sheffield city centre was renamed "The Bessemer" in homage to Henry Bessemer, who had a huge impact on the Steel City's development. In Workington, Cumbria, the local Wetherspoons pub is now named after him.

In 2002 the Institute of Materials, Minerals and Mining (IOM3) was established from mergers encompassing historical organisations including the Iron and Steel Institute, of which Bessemer was president from 1871 to 1873; the latter organisation instituted the Bessemer Gold Medal under his tenure. IOM3 still recognises Bessemer's legacy with an annual award of the medal for outstanding services to the steel industry; recent recipients include Indira Samarasekera.

In 2003 Bessemer was named among the top 10 technological innovators in Human Accomplishment: The Pursuit of Excellence in the Arts and Sciences, 800 B.C. to 1950. That a man who did so much for industrial development did not receive higher recognition from his own government was a source of deep regret for English engineers, who alluded to the fact that in the United States, where the Bessemer process found much use, eight cities or towns bore his name.

Notes

References

Sources

External links 

 
 

1813 births
1898 deaths
British metallurgists
Burials at West Norwood Cemetery
Businesspeople in steel
English inventors
Fellows of the American Academy of Arts and Sciences
Fellows of the Royal Society
Huguenots
Knights Bachelor
Members of the French Academy of Sciences
People from Hitchin
People of the Industrial Revolution